Dmitry Sergeyevich Makovsky (born 18 March 2000) is a Russian football player. He plays for FC Ural-2 Yekaterinburg.

Club career
He made his debut in the Russian Premier League for FC Ural Yekaterinburg on 11 December 2021 in a game against FC Rostov.

Career statistics

References

External links
 
 
 
 

2000 births
Living people
Russian footballers
Association football midfielders
FC Ural Yekaterinburg players
Russian Second League players
Russian Premier League players